Topa Inca Yupanqui or Túpac Inca Yupanqui, translated as "noble Inca accountant," (c. 1441–c. 1493) was the tenth Sapa Inca (1471–93) of the Inca Empire, fifth of the Hanan dynasty. His father was Pachacuti, and his son was Huayna Capac. Topa Inca belonged to the Qhapaq panaca (one of the clans of Inca nobles). His wife was his older sister, Mama Ocllo.

Biography

His father appointed him to head the Inca army in 1463.

He extended the realm along the Andes through modern Ecuador, and developed a special fondness for the city of Quito, which he rebuilt with architects from Cuzco. During this time his father Pachacuti reorganized the kingdom of Cuzco into the Tahuantinsuyu, the "four provinces." Tupac Inca led extensive military conquests to extend the Inca empire across much of Southern America.

He became Sapa Inca (sole ruler) in his turn upon his father's death in 1471, ruling until his own death in 1493. He conquered Chimor, which occupied the northern coast of what is now Peru, the largest remaining rival to the Incas.

He conquered the province of Antis and subdued the Collas. He imposed rules and taxes, creating two Governor Generals, Suyuyoc Apu, one in Xauxa and the other in Tiahuanacu. Tupac Inca Yupanqui created the fortress Saksaywaman on the high plateau above Cuzco, which included storehouses for provisions and clothing.

Tupac Inca died about 1493 in Chincheros, leaving two legitimate sons, and 90 illegitimate sons and daughters. Chuqui Ocllo, one of the wives of Tupac Yupanqui, convinced him that his son Ccapac Huari would succeed him, however, Topa Inca Yupanqoi changed his mind and decided on his son Titu Cusi Hualpa (who would later become emperor Huayna Capac). This provoked anger in Chuqui Ocllo and she poisoned Topa Inca. She and her favorite son were both killed soon after Topa Inca's death.

The Pacific Expedition

Legend
Topa Inca Yupanqui is also credited with leading a roughly 10-month-long voyage of exploration into the Pacific around 1480, reportedly visiting islands he called Nina Chumpi ("fire belt") and Hawa Chumpi ("outer belt", also spelled Avachumpi, Hahua chumpi). The voyage is mentioned in the History of the Incas by Pedro Sarmiento de Gamboa in 1572. Pedro Sarmiento described the expedition as follows:…there arrived at Tumbez some merchants who had come by sea from the west, navigating in balsas with sails. They gave information of the land whence they came, which consisted of some islands called Avachumbi and Ninachumbi, where there were many people and much gold. Tupac Inca was a man of lofty and ambitious ideas, and was not satisfied with the regions he had already conquered. So he determined to challenge a happy fortune, and see if it would favour him by sea.…

The Inca, having this certainty, determined to go there. He caused an immense number of balsas to be constructed, in which he embarked more than 20,000 chosen men.…

Tupac Inca navigated and sailed on until he discovered the islands of Avachumbi and Ninachumbi, and returned, bringing back with him slaves, gold, a chair of brass, and a skin and jaw bone of a horse. These trophies were preserved in the fortress of Cuzco until the Spaniards came. The duration of this expedition undertaken by Tupac Inca was nine months, others say a year, and, as he was so long absent, every one believed he was dead.
– "¿Viajarón los Incas por Oceanía?" Revista Enraizada. (In Spanish) 2020.

Analysis
Many historians are skeptical that the voyage ever took place. Supporters have usually identified the islands with the Galápagos Islands. It has also been suggested that one of the islands was Easter Island, where oral traditions have claimed that a group of long-eared hanau eepe came to the island from an unknown land.

See also

Pre-Columbian rafts

References

External links
 
 "¿Viajarón los Incas por Oceanía?" Revista Enraizada. (In Spanish) 2020.

Inca emperors
Pre-Columbian trans-oceanic contact
Year of birth unknown
1493 deaths
15th-century South American people
15th-century monarchs in South America
Nobility of the Americas